Ucureña is a small town in Bolivia.

References

Populated places in Cochabamba Department